This article presents a list of the historical events and publications of Australian literature during 1901.

Books 

 Guy Boothby
 Farewell, Nikola
 A Millionaire's Love Story
 My Strangest Case
 The Mystery of the Clasped Hands
 Ada Cambridge – The Devastators
 Miles Franklin – My Brilliant Career
 E. W. Hornung – The Shadow of the Rope
 Ambrose Pratt – Franks, Duellist
 Ethel Turner – Wonder Child

Short stories 

 Louis Becke
 By Rock and Pool, On an Austral Shore, and Other Stories 
 Yorke the Adventurer and Other Stories
 Rolf Boldrewood
 In Bad Company and Other Stories
 "Fallen Among Thieves"
 Nat Gould – "Chased by Fire"
 Henry Lawson 
 "At Dead Dingo"
 The Country I Come From
 Joe Wilson and His Mates
 "The Loaded Dog" 
 Louise Mack – "The Bond"

Poetry 

 George Essex Evans – "The Women of the West"
 Henry Lawson 
 "The Men Who Made Australia"
 " The Never-Never Country"
 Louisa Lawson – "Lines Written During a Night Spent in a Bush Inn"
 Louise Mack – Dreams in Flower
 A.B. Paterson 
 "The Protest"
 "The Wargeilah Handicap"
 Roderic Quinn – The Circling Hearths
 Alfred George Stephens ed. – The Bulletin Reciter: A Collection of Verses for Recitation from the Bulletin 1880-1901

Births 

A list, ordered by date of birth (and, if the date is either unspecified or repeated, ordered alphabetically by surname) of births in 1901 of Australian literary figures, authors of written works or literature-related individuals follows, including year of death.

 12 January – Eve Pownall, writer for children (died 1982)
 27 March – Kenneth Slessor, poet and journalist (died 1971)
 15 May – Xavier Herbert, novelist (died 1984)
 26 August – Eleanor Dark, novelist (died 1985)
 28 September – T. Inglis Moore, writer and editor (died 1978)

Deaths 

A list, ordered by date of death (and, if the date is either unspecified or repeated, ordered alphabetically by surname) of deaths in 1901 of Australian literary figures, authors of written works or literature-related individuals follows, including year of birth.

 4 October — Robert Richardson, poet and writer for children (born 1850)
 30 November – Edward John Eyre, explorer and writer (born 1815)

See also 
 1901 in poetry
 List of years in literature
 List of years in Australian literature
 1901 in literature
 1900 in Australian literature
 1901 in Australia
 1902 in Australian literature

 
Australian literature by year
20th-century Australian literature